Baby Alive is a baby doll brand made by Hasbro that eats, drinks, wets and in some cases messes and has a movable mouth. It was originally made and introduced by Kenner in 1973, and reintroduced by Hasbro in 2006.

History

1970s-1980s
The first Baby Alive doll was introduced by Kenner in 1973. It could be fed food packets mixed with water, and came with a bottle, diapers, and feeding spoon. The spoon would be inserted into its mouth, and a lever on its back pushed to have it chew the food. The food would move through the doll and end up in her diaper as plastic waste. The doll was intentionally designed to simulate the challenges of infant care. In the early 1980s, Baby Alive achieved popularity, selling up to 1 million dolls each year.

1990s
In 1992 the first talking Baby Alive doll was produced. It was fed in the same manner, but swallowed automatically without the need for a lever, and used a potty instead of a diaper. There were sensors located inside the doll to detect what stage the food was at, and trigger its voice to say "I have to go potty" or "All done now". These dolls did not sell well due to the loud gear noises and her "deep adult voice". It was later discontinued, and a non-speaking baby was released in 1995 with snacks and juice boxes, although these came in boxes and cans rather than packets that were mixed with water. They, as opposed to modern Baby Alive doll food and juice, had names such as Yummy Juice and Baby Cherries. It only came in two versions, Baby Alive and Baby All Gone. It appeared as a doll with blue eyes and messy curly blonde hair, not dissimilar to the modern doll, although the 1990s version seemed more traditional and less "cartoon-ey". Nowadays, Baby All Gone is fed bananas and yogurt instead of cherries, and the juice or milk is given from a bottle instead of a juice box, which saved on cardboard waste from empty boxes. A new, updated doll was introduced called Juice & Cookies Baby Alive who could be fed juice from a box, and cookies could actually be made, when a mix was put in a triangular mould, baked and removed with a scoop. The doll drank and chewed automatically.

Present
After The Kenner Company folded into Hasbro, Hasbro redesigned Baby Alive and in 2006 released a more realistic speaking doll, with additional accessories sold separately.

Newborn dolls
Sip 'N Slurp, A baby which when her tummy is squeezed she "drinks" from her juice cup with a straw attached and "wets" her diaper.  A Sip 'n' Slurp birthday doll was released in 2008 is the same principle as sip n' slurp, but her birthday can be celebrated everyday because she can "blow" on her party blower and "blow" out a candle on her cupcake she has a cup with attached straw just like the Sip 'n' Slurp.
Wets 'N Wiggles, This doll comes in either a girl or a boy and is given juice and lets you know it is wet by crying and wiggling and then the diaper is changed. It Does Cry And Baby Talk.
Pat 'N Burp, A newborn baby that "drinks" from her bottle and when pat or squeezed, she "burps". She can come in numerous skin and eye colors.
Sip 'N Snooze, A baby that gets "sleepy" as you feed her a bottle and gets snuggled when she falls asleep. She can come in blonde or brunette hair colors.

Speaking toddler dolls
Baby Alive Learns to Potty: A new potty training version of the doll, where the baby gets fed and is given a bottle and tells you when she has to go potty by saying phrases such as "Potty time!" or "Hurry-hurry!", and she "goes" when the food and water move through her, but she has a diaper just in case and then she says "Oops! I had an accident" if she is not put on the potty in time. She also says "I'm a big girl" or "I love you, Mommy", says "Yummy!" or "Mmm, good!" when she is fed with her doll food or from her bottle, and sings a discordant version of "Twinkle, Twinkle, Little Star". Also, she has a learning feature, where she gets better at using her potty after each feeding. She will ask to use it twice after the second feeding before she goes in her diaper, and so on until the fifth feeding. 
Baby Alive Baby's New Teeth: A doll who is "teething". If her tongue is pressed, new teeth will appear. She has a special teething chew ring, and if you give her a teething cookie she will actually "take a bite". She drinks from her cup and then wets her diaper. She comes with a toothbrush and toothpaste so the child can "brush" them.
Baby Alive Soft Face 2006 doll: she can be fed a doll food paste made from a powder, and given a bottle of water. They move through her and end up in her diaper, which is then changed.
Baby Alive Real Surprises: A reissue of the 2006 doll, who eats her doll food and drinks from her bottle, and then wets and messes her diaper afterwards saying "Uh-oh! I made a poo-poo" or "I made a stinky!" or "Surprise!". She talks, sucks her pacifier and sings a discordant version of "Twinkle, Twinkle, Little Star". Many people make handmade bottles, doll food and pacifiers for these dolls instead of using those designated. A new version of this doll was introduced in 2013.
Baby Alive Bouncing Babbles: A doll who can bounce up and down, operated by a small internal motor, and which makes giggling and cooing sounds. 
Baby Alive Better Now Baby: A doll who is ill and needs treatment. She drinks water from a cup, and then wets her diaper. She is given medicine and the child can "check her up" as if they are a doctor caring for a patient. A new version of this doll was introduced in 2013.
Baby Alive Baby Go Bye Bye: A doll that is designed for travel by having a papoose and baby carrier in one unit.
Baby All Gone: a doll who is fed "bananas" on a magnetic spoon and makes them "disappear", although the food and drinks do not move through to minimise mess caused by doll food moving through. They seem to go into the doll's mouth when they are mechanically retracted back into the spoon. Also, she drinks juice from her bottle, although this doll, unlike other Baby Alive dolls, does not wet. The juice, although seeming to disappear, is also retracted back into the bottle instead of being consumed and moving through. A new version of this doll with drink and wet features was introduced in 2017.
My Baby Alive: a doll who is fed powdered doll food mixed with water and water from her bottle. She makes a belching sound, wets and messes her diaper, and then asks "Did I make a stinky?". She comes in numerous skin, eye and hair colors.

Baby Alive dolls at present are more sophisticated than those of the past, including a stationary bracelet with a button, which when pressed activates the doll to say a phrase, a moving mouth which opens when it senses its special magnetic spoon, bottle or pacifier, or it speaks, and large cartoon-like eyes which can be programmed to open and close, rather than traditional closing eyes when the doll is put down.

Other media 
In July 2021, Hasbro launched an animated series on YouTube based on the Baby Alive brand. The series consists of 20 episodes and centers on a seven-year-old girl named Charlie who cares for Baby Alive dolls.

Influence and legacy 
Time reporter Allie Townsend included Baby Alive in a list of the "100 most influential toys from 1923 to the present" remarking on the lifelike functions of the doll.

References

External links 
 Hasbro Baby Alive website

Doll brands
1970s toys
Products introduced in 1973
Hasbro products